Marcial Cuquerella Gamboa (born November 19, 1977) is a Spanish entrepreneur and founder of 7NN Televisión. He is the Chairman and CEO of Gooru, a live streaming and advertising video company which he co-founded in 2013 as a start-up. Cuquerella is also the founder of The Glue Concept, a company incubator which operates in the US, México and Spain.

Career
Cuquerella has two degrees in engineering (Computing Engineer and Civil Engineer) and two MBAs (IE and IESE). He began his career as a 24-year-old CEO at Grupo Cope Navarra, then in 2005 he was appointed CEO of the Multimedia Company Intereconomía Corp running three TV Stations, a radio, two magazines and a national newspaper in Spain. He has funded and produced films related to religion, such as Pope John Paul II 

He founded Wouzee, a start up  based on the live streaming concept, which became famous in February 2016 during the Princess Cristina Trials  when someone sneaked a camera in to the proceedings and broadcast everything, despite the judge banning any recording devices in the chamber.

In April 2014 he founded Wouzee America LLC in Houston, Miami and Puebla (México).

In 2014, he was identified by the testimony of witnesses during a trial as a leading figure in Spain of the Mexican far-right cult El Yunque.

In 2021, Marcial Cuquerella launched a new Broadcast TV, focused on news and current events.

Controversy
On September 9, 2014 during an interview Cuquerella was asked for advice for young people looking for a job. In reply he said, "If you are looking for a job, do it for free a couple of months, if you are good enough you will get hired and even they will pay you those months". This statement was broadcast by national media sites. The next day he released a press statement where he said that his only intention was to serve as inspiration, not to hurt any feelings.

The Spanish newspaper El País, one of the most important in Spain, has referred to him as a leader of the "Spanish Tea Party".

References

External links
 Marcial Cuquerella lanza La Alternativa - 7nn 
 
 
 

1977 births
Living people
Spanish chairpersons of corporations